Adhyaksa Farmel Football Club is an Indonesian football club based in Kelapa Dua, Tangerang Regency, Banten. They currently competes in Liga 3.

History
Founded on 20 January 2020, Farmel made club debut into Indonesian football by joining the third-tier league Indonesia Liga 3 in 2020. As a first step, Farmel's management has appointed Adnan Mahing as head coach. he is the coach who managed to bring Persikota Tangerang to become the champion of Liga 3 Banten zone in the 2018 and 2019 seasons. But this  season (2020) competition was cancelled due to the COVID-19 pandemic in Indonesia.

On 2 November 2021, Farmel made their third-tier league match debut in a 9–0 big win against club from South Tangerang Bintang Junior at the Krakatau Steel Stadium. in the next match, Farmel will face a team from Serang Banten Jaya. four days later, in that match, they had their second match in a 3–1 win against Banten Jaya. On 18 November, Farmel closed the match in the group stage of 2021 Liga 3 Banten zone in a 0–0 draw against Jagat, with this result, they qualified for the second round as winners of Group C with 13 points. On 25 November, Farmel qualified for the semi-finals of the Liga 3 Banten zone as group E winners after their match won 1–0 over Persikota Tangerang. In the semi-final match against Matrix Putra Brother's three days later, they qualified to the final in a 3–1 win. three days later, they failed to win in final match after draw 1–1 in the first half to extra time, and lost on penalties (3–4) against Persikota, however, Farmel qualified for the 2021–22 Liga 3 national round with his status as runner-up for the Liga 3 Banten zone.

Honours
Liga 3 Banten
Runner-up (1): 2021

Controversies
In the round of 32 in Group X the national round of the competition 2021–22 Liga 3 (Indonesia) between Bandung United against Farmel FC at the AAL Jala Krida Stadium Surabaya, Sunday 20 February 2022, in that match Farmel FC benefited a lot from a very controversial referee decision. The match was led by Andri Novendra.
 
Bandung United's disappointment with the referee has occurred since the first half, even in the second half the match was stopped because the referee issued a controversial decision, including giving a red card to Saiful in the 51st minute and Rizki Arohman in the 61st minute. The climax, towards the end of the game in 88 minutes, when Bandung United goalkeeper, Satrio Azhar was given a red card. Not only the goalkeeper, one other player Andri Febriansyah was also sent off, so there were four red cards given by the referee. The player who became an impromptu goalkeeper, Arsan Makarin could actually block Ikhsan Ilham's penalty kick, but quickly Ikhsan grabbed the ball and put it into the goal.
 
Bandung United players, seemed to give a gesture of applause to the opposing players who managed to break into the goal while holding Farmel FC's advantage to 2–0. Not long ago, Farmel FC again attacked, but as a form of disappointment to the referee who led the match, Bandung United players seem to let the opposing player's kickball into the net. So, the score changed to 3–0. When the final whistle sounded, the Bandung United officials and players seemed to give applause to the referee as a form of disappointment.
 
Previously, several teams that competed with Farmel FC felt aggrieved by the referee's decisions which were considered unreasonable. For example, when in the match NZR Sumbersari against Farmel FC there was even a commotion between the officials and NZR Sumbersari players with a match that was considered detrimental to the NZR Sumbersari team when Farmel FC received a penalty at the end of the match and made the score 1–1, This result then made NZR Sumbersari fail to qualify from the round of 64.
 
Then PSBL Langsa also protested the referee's decision which made his team lose 4–1 to Farmel FC at the AAL Jala Krida Stadium on 18 February 2022, In this match, the referee's leadership was considered detrimental to the Langsa PSBL team, such as the penalty obtained by Farmel FC and other decisions. Even the coach of PSBL Langsa, Azhar satirized the match kit and Farmel FC in an upload on his Instagram account by mentioning "Terimakasih mafia, terimakasih oknum. Kalian mengajarkan anak-anak pesepakbola Aceh untuk tidak percaya lagi dengan sepakbola Indonesia" which means "Thank you mafia, thank you people. You teach the children of Aceh footballers not to believe in Indonesian football anymore".

In the round of 16 match of the Liga 3 season 2021–2022 on March 6, 2022, Farmel FC again benefited from the controversial decision of the referee, for example, when Persikota players who stood in an onside position which was then judged by the referee as offside and a controversy penalty given by the referee to Farmel FC. In this match Farmel FC managed to beat Prilly-Latuconsina's club Persikota Tangerang with a score of 3–0.

References

External links

Tangerang Regency
Football clubs in Banten
Football clubs in Indonesia
Association football clubs established in 2020
2020 establishments in Indonesia